Frans Alfred Meeng (18 January 1910 – 18 September 1944) was an Indonesian football midfielder who played for the Dutch East Indies in the 1938 FIFA World Cup. He also played for SVVB Batavia.

A corporal in the Netherlands Marine Corps in World War II who became a prisoner-of-war of the Japanese, he died along with thousands of others when the Japanese cargo ship Jun'yō Maru sank after being torpedoed by the British submarine HMS Tradewind.

References

External links
 

1910 births
1944 deaths
Indonesian footballers
Indonesia international footballers
Association football midfielders
1938 FIFA World Cup players
People from Palembang
Royal Netherlands Marine Corps personnel of World War II
Dutch military personnel killed in World War II
Deaths due to shipwreck at sea
Dutch prisoners of war in World War II
World War II prisoners of war held by Japan
Military personnel killed by friendly fire